Solubalm (also Romanized as Solūbalm, Salū Balam, and Salūbalm; also known as Salūbam) is a village in Shamil Rural District, Takht District, Bandar Abbas County, Hormozgan Province, Iran. At the 2006 census, its population was 145, in 46 families.

References 

Populated places in Bandar Abbas County